The following lists events that happened during 1969 in South Africa.

Incumbents
 State President: Jim Fouché.
 Prime Minister: John Vorster.
 Chief Justice: Lucas Cornelius Steyn.

Events

April
 14-16 – A summit meeting of the leaders of East and Central African States in Lusaka results in the issue of the Lusaka Manifesto on 16 April.
 17 – Dorothy Fisher is the first woman and the fifth person to receive a heart transplant under Dr. Christiaan Barnard.
 25 to 1 May – The African National Congress holds its first national consultative conference in Morogoro, Tanzania. It becomes known as the "Morogoro Conference".

May
 1 – The Department of Intelligence and Security of the African National Congress is established under Moses Mabhida.

June
 4-10 – P.W. Botha, Minister of Defence, visits France accompanied by General R.C. Hiemstra, Chief of the Defence Force, Lieutenant-General W.P. Louw, Chief of the Army and Lieutenant-General J.P. Verster, Chief of the Air Force.

Unknown date
 Dorothy Nyembe is convicted of defeating the ends of justice by harbouring members of Umkhonto we Sizwe and is sentenced to 15 years imprisonment in Barberton Prison.
 South Africa's Atomic Energy Board creates a commission to evaluate the technical and economic aspects of peaceful nuclear explosives for use in mines.

Births
 3 February – Retief Goosen, golfer.
 10 February – James Small, rugby player (d. 2019).
 16 February – Mpho Moerane, businessman and politician (d. 2022)
 5 March – Derek Crookes, cricketer.
 22 March – David Nyathi, soccer player
 12 April – Lucas Radebe, captain of the South Africa national football team.
 2 June – Taha Karaan, scholar and jurist (d. 2021)
 8 June – Jerry Sikhosana, soccer player
 24 June – Thabo Mngomeni, soccer player
 28 June 
 Linda Buthelezi, soccer player
 Phil Masinga, soccer player. (d. 2019)
 27 July – Jonty Rhodes, cricketer.
 28 August – Nthati Moshesh, actress.
 14 September – Chris Rossouw (rugby union, born 1969), rugby player
 25 September – Hansie Cronje, all-rounder cricketer. (d. 2002)
 17 October – Ernie Els, golfer.
 18 October – Japie Mulder, rugby player.
 20 October – Helman Mkhalele, soccer player
 27 November – Alan Dawson (cricketer), cricketer
 24 December – Sean Cameron Michael, actor and singer.
 29 December – Brendan Venter, rugby player.

Deaths

Railways

Locomotives
 The South African Railways places the first of twenty Class 6E1,  electric locomotives in mainline service.

References

South Africa
Years in South Africa
History of South Africa